L'Album du peuple – Tome 1 is the first comedy album from François Pérusse. He received a Félix award for his work.

Track listing 
 "Bonjour la terre" - 2:56
 "Les médias" - 10:56
 "Le rap du mille-pattes" - 2:31
 "Dites-le avec une chanson" - 8:14
 "La Bolduc du jour" - 2:24
 "Le royaume des animaux" - 7:58
 "Cette chère culture" - 12:30
 "Hymne au printemps II" - 2:34
 "Le peuple et la consommation" - 9:49
 "Le reggae du pourri" - 2:29
 "Bye bye le peuple" - 1:08

References 

1991 debut albums
François Pérusse albums